Microbacterium marinum is a Gram-positive and rod-shaped bacterium from the genus Microbacterium which has been isolated from seawater from the South-West Indian Ocean.

References

Further reading

External links
Type strain of Microbacterium marinum at BacDive -  the Bacterial Diversity Metadatabase	

Bacteria described in 2012
marinum